Selegiline, also known as L-deprenyl and sold under the brand names Eldepryl and Emsam among others, is a medication which is used in the treatment of Parkinson's disease and major depressive disorder. It is provided in the form of a capsule or tablet taken by mouth for Parkinson's disease and as a patch applied to skin for depression.

Selegiline acts as a monoamine oxidase inhibitor, and increases levels of monoamine neurotransmitters in the brain. At typical clinical doses used for Parkinson's disease, selegiline is a selective and irreversible inhibitor of monoamine oxidase B (MAO-B), increasing levels of dopamine in the brain. In larger doses (more than 20 mg/day), it loses its specificity for MAO-B and also inhibits MAO-A, which increases serotonin and norepinephrine levels in the brain.

Medical uses

Parkinson's disease
In its pill form, selegiline is used to treat symptoms of Parkinson's disease. It is most often used as an adjunct to drugs such as levodopa (L-DOPA), although it has been used off-label as a monotherapy. The rationale for adding selegiline to levodopa is to decrease the required dose of levodopa and thus reduce the motor complications of levodopa therapy. Selegiline delays the point when levodopa treatment becomes necessary from about 11 months to about 18 months after diagnosis. There is some evidence that selegiline acts as a neuroprotectant and reduces the rate of disease progression, though this is disputed.

Selegiline has also been used off-label as a palliative treatment for dementia in Alzheimer's disease.

Depression
Selegiline is also delivered via a transdermal patch used as a treatment for major depressive disorder.
Administration of transdermal selegiline bypasses hepatic first pass metabolism. This avoids inhibition of gastrointestinal and hepatic MAO-A activity, which would result in an increase of food-borne tyramine in the blood and possible related adverse effects, while allowing for a sufficient amount of selegiline to reach the brain for an antidepressant effect.

A quantitative review published in 2015 found that for the pooled results of the pivotal trials, the number needed to treat (a sign of effect size, so a low number is better) for the patch for symptom reduction was 11, and for remission, was 9. The number needed to harm (inverse of the NNT, a high number here is better) ranged from 387 for sexual side effects to 7 for application site reaction. With regard to the likelihood to be helped or harmed (LHH), the analysis showed that the selegiline patch was 3.6 times as likely to lead to a remission vs. a discontinuation due to side effects; the LHH for remission vs. incidence of insomnia was 2.1; the LHH for remission vs. discontinuation due to insomnia was 32.7. The LHH for remission vs. insomnia and sexual dysfunction were both very low.

Special populations
For all human uses and all forms, selegiline is pregnancy category C: studies in pregnant lab animals have shown adverse effects on the fetus but there are no adequate studies in humans.

Side effects
Side effects of the tablet form in conjunction with levodopa include, in decreasing order of frequency, nausea, hallucinations, confusion, depression, loss of balance, insomnia, increased involuntary movements, agitation, slow or irregular heart rate, delusions, hypertension, new or increased angina pectoris, and syncope. Most of the side effects are due to a high dopamine signaling, and can be alleviated by reducing the dose of levodopa.

The main side effects of the patch form for depression include application-site reactions, insomnia, diarrhea, and sore throat. The selegiline patch carries a black box warning about a possible increased risk of suicide, especially for young people, as do all antidepressants since 2007.

Interactions 

Both the oral and patch forms come with strong warnings against combining selegiline with drugs that could produce serotonin syndrome, such as SSRIs and the cough medicine dextromethorphan.  Selegiline in combination with the opioid analgesic pethidine is not recommended, as it can lead to severe adverse effects. Several other synthetic opioids such as tramadol and methadone, as well as various triptans, are contraindicated due to potential for serotonin syndrome.

Birth control pills containing ethinylestradiol and a progestin increase the bioavailability of selegiline by 10- to 20-fold. High levels can lead to loss of MAO-B selectivity, and selegiline may begin inhibiting MAO-A as well. This increases susceptibility to side effects of non-selective MAOIs, such as tyramine-induced hypertensive crisis and serotonin toxicity when combined with serotonergic medications.

Both forms of the drug carry warnings about food restrictions to avoid hypertensive crisis that are associated with MAO inhibitors. The patch form was created in part to overcome food restrictions; clinical trials showed that it was successful. Additionally, in post-marketing surveillance from April 2006 to October 2010, only 13 self-reports of possible hypertensive events or hypertension were made out of 29,141 exposures to the drug, and none were accompanied by objective clinical data. The lowest dose of the patch method of delivery, 6 mg/24 hours, does not require any dietary restrictions. Higher doses of the patch and oral formulations, whether in combination with the older non-selective MAOIs or in combination with the reversible MAO-A inhibitor moclobemide, require a low-tyramine diet.

Pharmacology

Pharmacodynamics 
Selegiline is a selective inhibitor of MAO-B, irreversibly inhibiting it by binding to it covalently. It is generally believed to exert its effects by blocking the breakdown of dopamine, thus increasing its activity; however, recent evidence suggests that MAO-A is solely or almost entirely responsible for the metabolism of dopamine. Its possible neuroprotective properties may be due to protecting nearby neurons from the free oxygen radicals that are released by MAO-B activity. At higher doses, selegiline loses its selectivity for MAO-B and inhibits MAO-A as well.

Selegiline potentiates the release of catecholamines independent of its MAO-B inhibiting action. As such, it has been called the "first synthetic catecholaminergic activity enhancer substance".

Selegiline also inhibits CYP2A6 and can increase the effects of nicotine as a result. Selegiline also appears to activate σ1 receptors, having a relatively high affinity for these receptors of approximately 400 nM.

Pharmacokinetics
Selegiline has an oral bioavailability of about 10%, which increases when ingested together with a fatty meal, as the molecule is fat soluble. Selegiline and its metabolites bind extensively to plasma proteins (at a rate of 94%). They cross the blood–brain barrier and enter the brain, where they most concentrated at the thalamus, basal ganglia, midbrain, and cingulate gyrus.

Selegiline is mostly metabolized in the intestines and liver; it and its metabolites are excreted in the urine.

Buccal administration of selegiline results in 5-fold higher bioavailability, more reproducible blood concentration, and produces fewer amphetamine metabolites than the oral tablet form.

Metabolism
Selegiline is metabolized by cytochrome P450 to L-desmethylselegiline and levomethamphetamine. Desmethylselegiline has some activity against MAO-B, but much less than that of selegiline. It is thought to be further metabolized by CYP2C19. Levomethamphetamine (the less potent of the two enantiomers of methamphetamine) is converted to levoamphetamine (the less potent of the two enantiomers of amphetamine, with regards to psychological effects).

Due to the presence of these metabolites, people taking selegiline may test positive for "amphetamine" or "methamphetamine" on drug screening tests. While the amphetamine metabolites may contribute to selegiline's ability to inhibit reuptake of the neurotransmitters dopamine and norepinephrine, they have also been associated with orthostatic hypotension and hallucinations. The amphetamine metabolites are hydroxylated and, in phase II, conjugated by glucuronyltransferase.

A newer anti-Parkinson MAO-B inhibitor, rasagiline, metabolizes into 1(R)-aminoindan, which has no amphetamine-like characteristics.

Patch
Following application of the patch to humans, an average of 25% to 30% of the selegiline content is delivered systemically over 24 hours. Transdermal dosing results in significantly higher exposure to selegiline and lower exposure to all metabolites when compared to oral dosing; this is due to the extensive first-pass metabolism of the pill form and low first-pass metabolism of the patch form. The site of application is not a significant factor in how the drug is distributed. In humans, selegiline does not accumulate in the skin, nor is it metabolized there.

Chemistry
Selegiline belongs to the phenethylamine and amphetamine chemical families. It is also known as L-deprenyl, as well as (R)-(–)-N,α-dimethyl-N-(2-propynyl)phenethylamine or (R)-(–)-N-methyl-N-2-propynylamphetamine. The compound is a derivative of levomethamphetamine (L-methamphetamine) with a propargyl group attached to the nitrogen atom. This detail is borrowed from pargyline, an older MAO-B inhibitor of the phenylalkylamine group. Selegiline is the levorotatory enantiomer of the racemic mixture deprenyl.

Selegiline is synthesized by the alkylation of (–)-methamphetamine using propargyl bromide.

Another clinically used MAOI of the amphetamine class is tranylcypromine.

History
Following the discovery that the tuberculosis drug iproniazid elevated the mood of people taking it, and the subsequent discovery that the effect was likely due to inhibition of MAO, many people and companies started trying to discover MAO inhibitors to use as antidepressants. Selegiline was discovered by Zoltan Ecseri at the Hungarian drug company, Chinoin (part of Sanofi since 1993), which they called E-250.  Chinoin received a patent on the drug in 1962 and the compound was first published in the scientific literature in English in 1965.  Work on the biology and effects of E-250 in animals and humans was conducted by a group led by József Knoll at Semmelweis University which was also in Budapest.

Deprenyl is a racemic compound a mixture of two isomers called enantiomers. Further work determined that the levorotatory enantiomer was a more potent MAO-inhibitor, which was published in 1967, and subsequent work was done with the single enantiomer L-deprenyl.

In 1971, Knoll showed that selegiline selectively inhibits the B-isoform of monoamine oxidase (MAO-B) and proposed that it is unlikely to cause the infamous "cheese effect" (hypertensive crisis resulting from consuming foods containing tyramine) that occurs with non-selective MAO inhibitors. A few years later, two Parkinson's disease researchers based in Vienna, Peter Riederer and Walther Birkmayer, realized that selegiline could be useful in Parkinson's disease. One of their colleagues, Prof. Moussa B.H. Youdim, visited Knoll in Budapest and took selegiline from him to Vienna. In 1975, Birkmayer's group published the first paper on the effect of selegiline in Parkinson's disease.

In the 1970s there was speculation that it could be useful as an anti-aging drug or aphrodisiac.

In 1987 Somerset Pharmaceuticals in New Jersey, which had acquired the US rights to develop selegiline, filed a new drug application (NDA) with the FDA to market the drug for Parkinson's disease in the US.  While the NDA was under review, Somerset was acquired in a joint venture by two generic drug companies, Mylan and Bolan Pharmaceuticals.  Selegiline was approved for Parkinson's disease by the FDA in 1989.

In the 1990s, J. Alexander Bodkin at McLean Hospital, an affiliate of Harvard Medical School, began a collaboration with Somerset to develop delivery of selegiline via a transdermal patch in order to avoid the well known dietary restrictions of MAO inhibitors.  Somerset obtained FDA approval to market the patch in 2006.

Society and culture
In E for Ecstasy (a book examining the uses of the street drug ecstasy in the UK) the writer, activist and ecstasy advocate Nicholas Saunders highlighted test results showing that certain consignments of the drug also contained selegiline. Consignments of ecstasy known as "Strawberry" contained what Saunders described as a "potentially dangerous combination of ketamine, ephedrine and selegiline," as did a consignment of "Sitting Duck" Ecstasy tablets.

David Pearce wrote The Hedonistic Imperative six weeks after starting taking selegiline.

In Gregg Hurwitz's novel Out of the Dark, selegiline (Emsam) and tyramine-containing food were used to assassinate the president of the United States.

Veterinary use
In veterinary medicine, selegiline is sold under the brand name Anipryl (manufactured by Zoetis). It is used in dogs to treat canine cognitive dysfunction and, at higher doses, pituitary-dependent hyperadrenocorticism (PDH). Canine cognitive dysfunction is a form of dementia that mimics Alzheimer's disease in humans. Geriatric dogs treated with selegiline show improvements in sleeping pattern, reduced incontinence, and increased activity level; most show improvements by one month. Though it is labeled for dog use only, selegiline has been used off-label for geriatric cats with cognitive dysfunction.

Selegiline's efficacy in treating pituitary-dependent hyperadrenocorticism has been disputed. Theoretically, it works by increasing dopamine levels, which downregulates the release of ACTH, eventually leading to reduced levels of cortisol. Some claim that selegiline is only effective at treating PDH caused by lesions in the anterior pituitary (which comprise most canine cases). The greatest sign of improvement is lessening of abdominal distention.

Side effects in dogs are uncommon, but they include vomiting, diarrhea, diminished hearing, salivation, decreased weight and behavioral changes such as hyperactivity, listlessness, disorientation, and repetitive motions.

Selegiline does not appear to have a clinical effect on horses.

Research
Selegiline has been limitedly studied in the treatment of attention deficit hyperactivity disorder (ADHD) in both children/adolescents and adults. In a small randomized trial of selegiline for treatment of ADHD in children, there were improvements in attention, hyperactivity, and learning/memory performance but not in impulsivity. In another small randomized controlled trial of selegiline for the treatment of adult ADHD, a high dose of the medication for 6 weeks was not significantly more effective than placebo in improving symptoms.

References 

Propargyl compounds
Antiparkinsonian agents
Dopamine reuptake inhibitors
Enantiopure drugs
Euphoriants
Monoamine oxidase inhibitors
Neuroprotective agents
Nootropics
Phenethylamines
Prodrugs
Sigma receptor ligands
Stimulants
Substituted amphetamines
Attention deficit hyperactivity disorder management
World Anti-Doping Agency prohibited substances